The sterile insect technique (SIT) is an environmentally friendly method for the biological control of pests using area-wide inundative release of sterile insects to reduce reproduction in a field population of the same species (IPPC, 2007). SIT technique may be applied as part of an area-wide control (integrated pest management) approach of insects of medical, veterinary, and agricultural importance. It was in 1937 when Edward Knipling proposed using sterilization to control or eradicate insect pests after observation that screwworm fly males mate repeatedly while females mate only once. He then made the hypothesis that if large numbers of sterile males could repeatedly be released into wild populations, it would eventually eliminate population reproduction and lead to eradication.

This table is a list of sterile insect technique trials worldwide.

See also 
 Genetically modified insect
 Insect ecology

References

External links
The International Database on Insect Disinfestation and Sterilization or IDIDAS
World-Wide Directory of SIT Facilities (DIR-SIT)
Insect Pest Control

Insect control